The abbreviation DSIP can have different meanings:

 Delta sleep-inducing peptide
 Revolutionary Socialist Workers' Party (Turkey) Devrimci Sosyalist İşçi Partisi, (DSİP)
 Disability Service Improvement Program (Social Security Administration)